The Harvard Centennial Medal is an honor given by the Harvard Graduate School of Arts and Sciences to recipients of graduate degrees from the School for their "contributions to society."

The Medal was established in 1989 on the 100th anniversary of the Graduate School's founding.  Seven individuals were recognized for their achievements that year, and between two and four graduate degree recipients have been honored every year since then.  Nominees are evaluated by university officials and alumni, and the winners are selected by the Harvard Corporation.

Winners
 2014 Anand Mahindra, J. Louis Newell, Emily Pulitzer
 2012 Daniel Aaron, Karl Eikenberry, Nancy Hopkins, Robert Keohane
 2011 Heisuke Hironaka, Jeffrey Alan Hoffman, Richard Wall Lyman, Nell Irvin Painter
 2010 David Bevington, Stephen Fischer-Galati, Eric Maskin, Martha Nussbaum
 2009 Svetlana Leontief Alpers, David Brion Davis, Thomas Crombie Schelling, Joseph Taylor
 2008 Susan Lindquist, Earl Powell III, Frank Shu, Ezra Vogel
 2007 Frederick P. Brooks Jr., Sarah Blaffer Hrdy, Neil L. Rudenstine, Jeffrey D. Sachs
 2006 Daniel Callahan, Sandra Faber, Robert Solow, and Kevin Starr
 2005 Michael Artin, H. Robert Horvitz, Elaine Pagels, and Michael Spence
 2004 John Adams, Susan Fiske, Richard Hunt, and George Rupp
 2003 Agnes Gund, Amy Gutmann, Leon Kass, and William Schneider
 2002 Lewis Branscomb, Madhav Gadgil, Joanne Martin, and Allen Puckett
 2001 Bernard Bailyn, Carolyn Bynum, Elliott Carter, and Walter Kohn
 2000 Harold Amos, Stanley Cavell, and Jill Ker Conway
 1999 Frances Fergusson, Nguyen Xuan Oanh, Carl Schorske, and Edward Wilson
 1998 Sissela Bok, I. Bernard Cohen, and Richard Zare
 1997 Richard Karp, Stuart Rice, Henry Rosovsky, and Ruth Simmons
 1996 Leon Botstein, Victor Fung, Paul Guyer, and Maxine Kumin
 1995 Philip Anderson and Zbigniew Brzezinski
 1994 Hanna H. Gray, Roald Hoffmann, and Rosalind Krauss
 1993 Renee Fox, Marilyn French, and Rolf Landauer
 1992 Edward Bernstein, Stanley Kunitz, Alice Rivlin, and Saul Cohen
 1991 Eleanor Lansing Dulles, Caryl Haskins, Wesley Posvar, and Susan Sontag
 1990 Margaret Atwood, Samuel H. Beer, and Leo Kadanoff
 1989 Thomas Eisner, Jesse Greenstein, Robert Motherwell, David Woodley Packard, Reginald Phelps, James Tobin, and Margaret Wilson

See also
Harvard Graduate School of Arts and Sciences

References

External links
Harvard Centennial Medal page at the Harvard Graduate School

Harvard University
Awards established in 1989